India-Thai Business Forum (ITBF) is a business forum.

Introduction 
The forum started in October, 2002 with 15 members. Now there are more than 150 members. The forum is an appropriate interactive platform, specially for entrepreneurs/professionals of Indian origin. One of the activities of the forum is to hold the monthly dinner meeting on every third Wednesday of the month, in which they invite a Thai or Indian dignitary as their guest speaker. Since its inception, they have never missed the monthly dinner meeting with a guest speaker. In fact, in some months they have had more than one meetings. Monthly meetings start with a short networking session where members meet each other and exchange notes on business as well as personal activities. The networking session is followed by the guest speaker presentation and a sumptuous buffet Indian dinner.

Speakers 
ITBF has had leading dignitaries including influential Thai and Indian  economists/politicians and other important figures as guest speakers at monthly dinner meetings. On 16 August 2006 the guest speaker is Abhisit Vejjajiva - Leader of Democratic Party of Thailand spoke on "Look West: Rethinking Thailand's Policy Towards India".

Members 

The members of India Thai Business Forum are Leading businessmen who indulge in trade activities between India and Thailand. Members of the press and The Indian Embassy also attend regularly.

References
 Original Article about India Thai Business Forum

External links 
 List of associations for Indians Living in Thailand
 Discussion board for Indians living in Thailand
 Startup with details of businesses

Business organizations based in Thailand
Foreign trade of India
India–Thailand relations
Business organisations based in India